State Route 158 (SR 158) is a  state highway in northern Mobile County in the southwestern corner of the U.S. state of Alabama. The western terminus of the highway is at an intersection with Newburn Road in Semmes. The eastern terminus of the highway is at an intersection with U.S. Route 43 (US 43) at Saraland. The route will eventually become part of US 98 west of Mobile to the Mississippi state line as a four-lane bypass of Semmes.

Route description
SR 158 serves as a connector route between Interstate 65 (I-65) and US 45/US 98 to the west and US 43 to the east. It is a four-lane roadway that connects Semmes with the University of Mobile and Saraland. The route widens to five lanes at its intersection with SR 213 near its interchange with I-65 at exit 13. East of the interstate highway, the highway narrows to two lanes as it continues to its intersection with US 43.

History

Future
SR 158 is being extended from its current western terminus to US 98. It will serve as a bypass of US 98. Construction began in 2017 and is scheduled for completion by 2023.

Major intersections

See also

References

External links

https://rp.dot.state.al.us/US98_SR158/
158
Transportation in Mobile County, Alabama
Mobile metropolitan area
U.S. Route 98